Heinrich Lanz AG is a former agricultural machinery manufacturer from Mannheim, Germany.  Its tractors were sold bearing the LANZ brand.  LANZ won numerous awards at the Strasbourg Agricultural Fair in 1866; namely four Gold, five Silver, and three Bronze.

The Heinrich Lanz AG company, and its LANZ brand name was ultimately acquired by way of a merger in 1956 by the American agricultural machinery manufacturer Deere & Company, and became the John Deere Works Mannheim (JDWM).

History
The Heinrich Lanz Company was founded in 1859 by German engineer Heinrich Lanz.  It produced the first steam-powered stationary threshing machines in 1879, and the first crude oil fuelled tractor; the Lanz Bulldog, in 1921.

In 1956, Heinrich Lanz AG merged with Deere & Company of Moline, Illinois, United States.

References

External links

German companies established in 1859
Engineering companies of Germany
John Deere